Ari Gunnarsson (born 15 November 1983) is an Icelandic strongman competitor from Reykjavík.

Career
Ari was passionate about lifting heavy weights since his teenage years and was renowned for his static shoulder strength. He won 3rd place in the 2010 Iceland's Strongest Viking competition and the following year, repeated the same performance together with winning 2nd place at both Strongest Man in Iceland and the Iceland's Strongest Man, the most prestigious title of all Icelandic strength competitions. Ari is an 8 time podium finisher of the competition, emerging the 1st runner up 4 times and 2nd runner up 4 times behind Hafþór Júlíus Björnsson from 2011 to 2020. Ari won the Strongest Man in Iceland competition back to back in 2018 and 2019.  

Ari also participated at the 2016 World's Strongest Man and 2017 World's Strongest Man competitions both held in Botswana, but couldn't advance into the finals since he secured only the 3rd place at group stages on both occasions.

Personal records
Deadlift -  x 5 reps 
Squat -  x 3 reps (stiff bar)
Bench Press -  (Raw)
Log press -  x 4 reps
Viking press -  x 13 reps
Circus Dumbbell press -  x 6 reps
Load & Drag - 2 x  sacks each over a 10 meter course and a  cart for 8.61 meters 
Keg Toss - 5 kegs (22–30 kg) over 4.5 meters in 25.73 seconds
Bus Pull -  for 25 meters in 45.68 seconds

References

1983 births
Living people
Icelandic strength athletes